The 1997 Atlantic hurricane season was a below-average hurricane season. It officially began on June 1, and lasted until November 30. These dates conventionally delimit the period of each year when most tropical cyclones form in the Atlantic basin. The 1997 season was inactive, with only seven named storms forming, with an additional tropical depression and an unnumbered subtropical storm. It was the first time since the 1961 season that there were no active tropical cyclones in the Atlantic basin during the entire month of August–historically one of the more active months of the season—a phenomenon that would not occur again until 2022. A strong El Niño is credited with reducing activity in the Atlantic, while increasing the number of storms in the eastern and western Pacific basins to 19 and 26 storms, respectively. As is common in El Niño years, tropical cyclogenesis was suppressed in the tropical latitudes, with only two becoming tropical storms south of 25°N.

The first system, an operationally unnoticed subtropical storm, developed north of the Bahamas on June 1 and dissipated by the following day without impact. Tropical Storm Ana developed offshore South Carolina on June 30 and dissipated on July 4, after causing minor affects in North Carolina. Hurricane Bill was a short-lived storm between that lasted from July 11 to July 13 and produced light rainfall in Newfoundland. As Bill was dissipating, Tropical Storm Claudette developed and generated rough seas in North Carolina. The most devastating storm was Hurricane Danny, which caused extensive flooding, particularly in southern Alabama. Danny resulted in 9 fatalities and about $100 million (1997 USD) in damage. The outer bands of Hurricane Erika brought rough seas and gusty winds to the Lesser Antilles, resulting in two deaths and $10 million in losses. The precursor to Tropical Storm Grace caused minor flooding in Puerto Rico, while Tropical Depression Five and Tropical Storm Fabian did not impact land. Collectively, the storms of the 1997 Atlantic hurricane season resulted in 12 fatalities and approximately $111.46 million in damage.


Seasonal forecasts 

Forecasts of hurricane activity are issued before each hurricane season by noted hurricane experts such as Dr. William M. Gray and his associates at Colorado State University (CSU), as well as the Weather Prediction Center (WPC). As stated by the National Oceanic and Atmospheric Administration (NOAA), an Atlantic hurricane season between 1981–2010 contained roughly twelve tropical storms, six hurricanes, three major hurricanes, and an accumulated cyclone energy (ACE) index of 66–103 units. NOAA typically categorizes a season as either above-average, average, of below-average based on the cumulative ACE Index; however, the number of tropical storms, hurricanes, and major hurricanes within a hurricane season is considered occasionally as well.

CSU's first outlook for the season, issued in December 1996, predicted eleven named storms, seven hurricanes, and three major hurricanes, which are defined as a tropical cyclone reaching at least a Category 3 rating on the Saffir–Simpson Hurricane Scale. These numbers went unchanged during their forecast updates released in April and May. CSU issued these predictions based on the possibility of El Niño weakening, a cessation of drought conditions over the Sahel, and nearly identical trade wind and atmospheric pressure patterns compared to the previous season. In August, however, CSU slightly decreased their predicted number of hurricanes and major hurricanes to six and two, respectively, after the El Niño strengthened instead. In early 1997, the WRC anticipated a less active season, forecasting seven named storms and four hurricanes, but issuing no prediction on the number of major hurricanes.

Seasonal summary 

The Atlantic hurricane season officially began on June 1, and an unnamed subtropical storm developed on the same day. Only nine tropical depressions formed. Eight of the depressions attained tropical storm status, making 1997 the least active Atlantic hurricane season in the ongoing above-average era of tropical cyclogenesis, which began in 1995. Just three of these systems attained hurricane status and only one tropical cyclone intensified into a major hurricane, which was below the 1981–2010 average of three per season. Only Danny made landfall at hurricane strength during the season, although Hurricane Erika and Tropical Storm Grace also caused damage and fatalities. Those three cyclones collectively caused 12 deaths and $111.46 million in damage. The last storm of the season, Tropical Storm Grace, dissipated on October 17, over a month before the official end of the season on November 30.

The 1997 Atlantic hurricane season had a very active beginning. In June, two tropical cyclones developed – the unnoticed subtropical storm and Tropical Storm Ana. An unusual four tropical cyclones formed in the month of July, three of which reached tropical storm intensity, and two of them became hurricanes. Despite the active start, the other months of the season featured record low activity, especially in August and September, both of which combined produced only one tropical cyclone. As a result of the active start and subsequent lack of activity, it showed that early season activity has no correlation to the entire season. Further, this marked the first occurrence of no tropical cyclogenesis in August since 1961, and the most recent instance of no activity in that month until 2022. The lone tropical cyclone during the period was Hurricane Erika, which developed on September 3. In October, two short-lived tropical cyclones developed, Fabian and Grace. Tropical cyclogenesis ceased after Grace transitioned into an extratropical cyclone on October 17.

The season's activity was reflected with a low accumulated cyclone energy (ACE) rating of 41. ACE is, broadly speaking, a measure of the power of the hurricane multiplied by the length of time it existed, so storms that last a long time, as well as particularly strong hurricanes, have high ACEs. It is only calculated for full advisories on tropical systems at or exceeding 39 mph (63 km/h), which is the threshold for tropical storm strength.

Systems

Unnamed Subtropical Storm 

A cluster of thunderstorms developed over Florida in late May. A shortwave trough brought it to the northeast, enhancing convection around a developing center of circulation. The low pressure area, which formed on May 31, developed into a subtropical depression on June 1. Operationally, it was treated as a frontal low, but post-analysis suggested it remained separate throughout its lifetime, and was classified as an unnamed subtropical storm. It reached subtropical storm strength six hours later as it moved rapidly parallel to the East Coast of the United States. The convection continued to wrap around the center, and despite unfavorable conditions from an approaching cold front it continued to intensify. Late on June 1, it reached its peak intensity with maximum sustained winds of 50 mph (85 km/h) while off the coast of North Carolina. The storm turned to the east, and transitioned extratropical late on June 2 southeast of Massachusetts. Shortly thereafter, the remnants of the storm merged with a cold front.

Tropical Storm Ana 

A frontal low pressure system off the coast of South Carolina developed into Tropical Depression One at 1200 UTC on June 30. It moved slowly eastward, and attained tropical storm status on July 1. After becoming a tropical storm, Ana slightly intensified. Later on July 2, a shortwave trough forced Ana to northeastward, into a region of increasing vertical wind shear. Simultaneously, Ana began to weaken, as it was moving into an area of decreasing sea surface temperatures.

By late on July 3, Ana weakened to a tropical depression. The storm also lost tropical characteristics and transitioned into an extratropical cyclone early on July 4, over the western Atlantic Ocean. The extratropical remnants persisted until dissipating about twenty-four hours later. Minimal impact was reported as a result of Ana, other than rip currents in coastal North Carolina. Due to the rough seas, 14 rescues and one serious injury occurred at Carolina Beach. In addition, five rescues were made at Kure Beach and at least one person was hospitalized. However, there were no fatalities at either location.

Hurricane Bill 

A large upper-level low separated from a trough north of Puerto Rico in early July. Convection increased on July 7 after a surface trough developed, and a low pressure area formed east of the Bahamas once the upper-level low retreated to the southwest. Wind shear decreased across the region, allowing the convection to increase and organize, and it is estimated the system developed into a tropical depression on July 11 about 330 mi (530 km) southwest of Bermuda. After developing, the cyclone moved northeastward in advance of an approaching cold front. It quickly intensified into Tropical Storm Bill, and briefly threatened to pass near Bermuda. As a result, a tropical storm warning was issued, although it was quickly dropped; there was no impact on the island from Bill.

Bill quickly intensified as it continued northeastward. By midday on July 12, an eye feature was observed on satellite images, which suggested that Bill intensified into hurricane status at a relatively high latitude. Bill dropped very light rainfall on Newfoundland, peaking at slightly less than 1 in (25 mm).

Tropical Storm Claudette 

The frontal system that influenced the track of Hurricane Bill spawned a non-tropical low off the southeast United States on July 11. The depression quickly intensified into Tropical Storm Claudette, based on reconnaissance aircraft data. It moved northeastward, passing southeast of the Outer Banks. Despite the presence of wind shear it developed banding features. On July 14, the storm reached peak winds of 45 mph (75 km/h). Thereafter, Claudette turned eastward ahead of a frontal system.

Its associated thunderstorm activity was sporadic and relatively disorganized, and the storm weakened to a tropical depression on July 16. Claudette briefly re-intensified into a tropical storm before becoming extratropical later that day. Shortly thereafter, it merged with a cold front, while the remnants were last noted near the Azores on July 23. Tropical Storm Claudette had minimal effects on land. Severe rip currents from Claudette in North Carolina caused several rescues and one person was injured, although no fatalities occurred. Some residents of coastal North Carolina were even disappointed that Claudette was to remain offshore, as the region was suffering from dry conditions.

Hurricane Danny 

A tropical low over the northern Gulf of Mexico developed into Tropical Depression Four on July 16. The depression headed slowly east-northeastward, and intensified into Tropical Storm Danny on the following day. Danny continued east-northeastward, and reached hurricane strength just before landfall near Buras, Louisiana. Because of the narrowness of that piece of land, most of Danny remained over water and it lost little strength. Danny re-emerged into the Gulf of Mexico, and strengthened slightly making two landfalls in Alabama as a low-end Category 1 hurricane on July 19. After remaining stationary for a day, Danny moved northward and weakened to a tropical depression. Heading northward across Alabama, Danny turned to the east and crossed over the Southeastern United States. While centered over North Carolina, Danny interacted with a developing trough, which caused it to re-intensify into a tropical storm. Shortly thereafter, Danny emerged over the Atlantic Ocean near the North Carolina–Virginia border on July 24. Danny took a northward turn, and came within  of Nantucket Island on July 26. It then turned out to sea and was absorbed by a front on July 27.

Although Danny was a hurricane upon landfall, strong winds were confined to a small area, with only portions of extreme eastern Louisiana reporting hurricane-force winds. Flooding occurred in portions of the state due to heavy rainfall. The floods and high winds produced by Danny damaged over 300 houses and more than 170 businesses in Louisiana alone. In Mississippi, Danny dropped heavy rainfall on the southern portion of the state, resulting in minor street and house flooding. As Danny crossed Dauphin Island, Alabama on July 19, it dropped  of rain. This made Danny the wettest tropical cyclone on record in Alabama. Hurricane force-winds were reported on Dauphin Island and the western shores of Mobile Bay. In the same area, many buildings had sustained roof damage. In addition, many homes on the Fowl and Fish Rivers reported significant damage. Further north in South Carolina and Virginia, Danny spawned several tornadoes; some of them caused significant damage. Heavy rainfall also occurred in some isolated areas; in central North Carolina between 8–12 in (200–300 mm) of rain was reported. Danny eventually affected Massachusetts, bring light rainfall and tropical storm-force winds to the southeastern portions of the state. Overall, Danny caused nine fatalities, and approximately $100 million in damage.

Tropical Depression Five 

A tropical wave emerged into the Atlantic Ocean from the west coast of Africa on July 11. The wave moved westward across the tropical Atlantic, and finally began to show consistent evidence of a cloud system center. The tropical depression moved west-northwestward and started showing signs of falling apart on July 18. Early on the following day, the depression degenerated into a tropical wave. Recon observations before the storm fell apart suggested that it may have briefly reached tropical storm strength. The tropical wave continued westward without regenerating and lost its identity on July 23 over the eastern Gulf of Mexico.

Hurricane Erika 

A tropical wave, which would later also develop Hurricane Nora, developed into Tropical Depression Six while it was centered about 1,150 mi (1,850 km) east of the southernmost Lesser Antilles on September 3. Later that day, the depression intensified enough to be upgraded to Tropical Storm Erika. It moved west-northwestward and steadily intensified to attain hurricane status on September 4. Erika passed a short distance to the north of the Lesser Antilles, and later turned to the north in response to an approaching trough. The hurricane quickly strengthened to reach peak winds of 125 mph (205 km/h) on September 8, and after maintaining peak strength for 24 hours Erika weakened over cooler waters. It turned to the east, weakened to a tropical storm, and became extratropical after passing near the Azores on September 15.

The hurricane produced light rainfall and winds throughout the northern Lesser Antilles. The passage of Erika brought a cloud of ash to Antigua from the eruption of the Soufrière Hills Volcano on Montserrat, a rare occurrence. Strong waves from the hurricane produced beach erosion and coastal flooding in northern Puerto Rico, and killed two surfers. Moderate wind gusts in Puerto Rico left thousands without power, and the hurricane resulted in $10 million in damage to the Caribbean territory of the United States. Erika also produced gusty winds and light rain in the Azores. Later in its duration, the storm brought hurricane-force wind gusts and rainfall to the Azores, though no damage was reported. Erika was the only tropical cyclone in the Atlantic basin in the month of September in this year, the first such occurrence in a hurricane season since 1929.

Tropical Storm Fabian 

A tropical wave emerged into the Atlantic Ocean from the west coast of Africa near Dakar, Senegal on September 22. The wave traveled westward with minimal tropical cyclogenesis and reached the Lesser Antilles about a week later. While passing through the islands, heavy rainfall and strong winds were reported. Eventually, the system developed into a broad area of low pressure and acquired a low-level circulation. However, upper-level wind shear resulted in no immediate further organization. After crossing Puerto Rico and the Virgin Islands, wind shear decreased, since the low was moving in the same direction as the upper-level winds.

However, the National Hurricane Center did not initiate advisories until 1500 UTC on October 7. The depression strengthened and about 24 hours after forming, it became Tropical Storm Fabian later on October 5. No further significant change in intensity occurred for the remainder of its duration, as Fabian had peaked with winds of 40 mph (65 km/h). The storm began losing tropical characteristics and transitioned into an extratropical cyclone at 1200 UTC on October 8.

Tropical Storm Grace 

An extratropical low formed just north of Hispaniola on October 14, and on the following day, it attained gale-force winds. In addition, the system was also acquiring tropical characteristics, and was classified as Tropical Storm Grace on October 16 at 0000 UTC. Though Grace was classified as a tropical cyclone, it still held onto some extratropical characteristics. Thereafter, Grace steadily weakened and eventually degenerated into an extratropical low on October 17.

As a result, flash flooding occurred throughout the island of Puerto Rico, while landslides caused damage to roads and bridges. In addition, numerous rivers overflowed their banks, which forced 37 people to seek shelter across the island. One fatality occurred, and damage amounted to $1.46 million. In addition, the extratropical system produced light to moderate rainfall in the U.S. Virgin Islands, and precipitation reached  along western sides of the islands.

Storm names 

The following names were used for named storms that formed in the north Atlantic in 1997. In the spring of 1998, no names were retired, so it was used again in the 2003 season. This is the same list used for the 1991 season except for Bill, which replaced Bob. A storm was named Bill for the first time in 1997.

Season effects 
This is a table of all of the storms that formed in the 1997 Atlantic hurricane season. It includes their duration, names, intensities, areas affected, damages, and death totals. Deaths in parentheses are additional and indirect (an example of an indirect death would be a traffic accident), but are still related to that storm. Damage and deaths include totals while the storm was extratropical or a wave or low, and all of the damage figures are in 1997 USD.

See also 

 List of Atlantic hurricanes
 Atlantic hurricane season
 1997 Pacific hurricane season
 1997 Pacific typhoon season
 1997 North Indian Ocean cyclone season
 South-West Indian Ocean cyclone seasons: 1996–97, 1997–98
 Australian region cyclone seasons: 1996–97, 1997–98
 South Pacific cyclone seasons: 1996–97, 1997–98

References

External links 

 Monthly Weather Review
 National Hurricane Center 1997 Atlantic hurricane season summary

 
Articles which contain graphical timelines